Harney County School District may refer to one of these school districts in Oregon:

Harney County School District 3, Burns
Harney County School District 4 (Crane Elementary School District), Crane
Harney County Union High School District (Crane Union High School District), Crane